Emotive may refer to:
 Emotive (sociology), a sociological term
 eMOTIVe, a 2004 rock album by A Perfect Circle
 Emotiv, a company which develops mind-computer interfaces